The Raj of Sarawak, also State of Sarawak, located in the northwestern part of the island of Borneo, was an independent state with a treaty of protection with United Kingdom starting from 1888. It was established as an independent state from a series of land concessions acquired by an Englishman, James Brooke, from the Sultan of Brunei. Sarawak received recognition as an independent state from the United States in 1850, and from the United Kingdom in 1864. The area now forms the Malaysian state of Sarawak.

Following recognition, Brooke expanded the Raj's territory at the expense of Brunei. Several major rebellions occurred against his rule, causing him to be plagued by debt incurred in countering the rebellions, and the sluggish economic situation at the time. His nephew, Charles Brooke, succeeded James and normalised the situation by improving the economy, reducing government debts and establishing public infrastructure. In 1888, the Raj acquired protected state status from the British Government whilst avoiding annexation.

To gear up economic growth, the second Rajah encouraged the migration of Chinese workers from China and Singapore to work in the agricultural fields. With proper economic planning and stability, Sarawak prospered and emerged as one of the world's major producers of black pepper, in addition to oil and the introduction of rubber plantations. He was succeeded by his son Charles Vyner Brooke but World War II and the arrival of Japanese forces ultimately brought an end to the Raj with the territory placed under a military administration on the Japanese capitulation in 1945, and annexed by Britain as its last acquisition as Crown Colony in 1946, against the Atlantic Charter.

History

Foundation and early years 

The Raj was founded by James Brooke, an English adventurer who arrived at the banks of the Sarawak River and decided to berth his schooner there in 1839. After serving in the First Anglo-Burmese War where he was severely wounded in battle, Brooke returned to England in 1825 to recover from his injury. Despite his attempts to return into service, he was unable to return to his station in India before his temporary leave from the service expired. Overstaying his furlough resulted in his position in the military being forfeited, but he was awarded a pension by the government for his service. He continued on from India and went to China to improve his health.

On his way to China in 1830, he saw the islands of the Asiatic Archipelago, still generally unknown to Europeans. He returned to England and made an abortive trading journey to China in the Findlay before his father died in 1835. Inspired by the adventure stories regarding the success of the East India Company (EIC) where his father had been serving, and especially by the efforts of Stamford Raffles to expand the company influence in the Asiatic Archipelago, he purchased a schooner named Royalist using the £30,000 left to him by his father. He recruited a crew for the schooner, training in the Mediterranean Sea in late 1836, before beginning their sail to the Far East on 27 October 1838. By July 1839, he reached Singapore and came across some British sailors who had been shipwrecked and helped by Pengiran Raja Muda Hashim, the uncle of Sultan Omar Ali Saifuddin II of Brunei.

Brooke originally planned to sail to Marudu Bay in northwestern Borneo, but the British Governor-General in Singapore asked him to thank Raja Muda Hashim in southwestern Borneo. The following month he sailed to the western coast of the island and on 14 August 1839, berthed his schooner on the banks of the Sarawak River and met Hashim to deliver the message. The Raja told Brooke that his presence in the area was to control a rebellion against the Sultanate of Brunei caused by the oppressive policies of Pengiran Indera Mahkota, a kinsman of the Sultan. Mahkota had earlier been dispatched by the Sultan to monopolise the antimony in the area; which as a result directly affected the incomes of the local Malays there amid growing frustration from the indigenous Land Dayak who had been forced to work in the mines for about 10 years. It has also been alleged that the rebellion against Brunei was aided by the neighbouring Sultanate of Sambas and the government of the Dutch East Indies, who wanted to establish economic rights over the antimony.  Due to these disturbances Brooke had limited access to explore the country, but he managed to explore up the Samarrahan river and spent some time at Rumah Jugah's longhouse at Lundu.  On 2 October 1839 he returned to Singapore. Brooke then spent another six months cruising along the coasts of the Celebes Islands before returning to Sarawak on 29 August 1840.

Establishment 
Upon his return to Sarawak, the rebellion against Brunei's rule was still in progress and Hashim asked Brooke to help.  Brooke joins Makhota's forces at Leda Tanah on 18 October 1840. By 20 December 1840 the rebels offered to surrender to Brooke provided they should not be put to death. Despite the initial refusal of Hashim to pardon them and wanting to execute all the rebels, Hashim was convinced by Brooke to forgive them as he had taken the major part in their suppression. "Hassim agreed to spare the insurgents’ lives and took the wives and children of the insurgency's leaders as hostages. Of the leaders themselves, Datu Patinggi Abdul Gapur and Datu Tumanggong Mersal withdrew to the protection of Sambas, while
Datu Patinggi Ali found refuge among the Malays at Sarikei."

In exchange for Brooke's support Muda Hashim had promised Brooke the country of Siniawan and Sarawak, and its government and trade.  On 14 February 1841, Brooke received papers declaring him "resident at Sarawak,", which granted him the permission to live in the province, and "to seek profit by trade".  Brooke leaves the next day in his yacht Royalist for Singapore, only to return to Sarawak in May 1841 with a second boat the Swift filled with British manufactured goods to trade with Muda Hashim. Brooke is disappointed upon his return that the house Hashim had promised to build for him was not ready, and the antimony he wanted in trade for the manufactured goods had not yet been worked.  Furthermore, Hashim, began to think twice about giving the territory to Brooke, a doubt fanned by Mahkota who had been deprived of his power in the area in favour of Brooke. This led Hashim to constantly delay the recognition of concession which frustrated Brooke. "Brooke’s estrangement from Hassim provided the Sarawak Malay datus with opportunities to re-establish their positions. They sent a delegation to Brooke led by Datu Tumanggong Mersal and Datu Patinggi Ali’s son, ‘to request him to become their Rajah, offering to support him by force of arms’."
On 23 September 1841, Brooke, with Royalist fully armed, went ashore to Hashim's audience chamber and called on him to negotiate. With little choice, and putting the blame mainly on Mahkota, Hashim granted Sarawak to Brooke on 24 September 1841. Brooke issued new laws for the territory banning slavery, headhunting and piracy; and by July 1842, his appointment was confirmed by Sultan Omar Ali Saifuddin II.

From 1843, Brooke actively suppressed piracy on the coasts of western and northern Borneo together with Captain Henry Keppel in HMS Dido. After talks with Serib Sahib, who controlled the Sadong river,  Keppel and Brooke's native forces attacked 3 rivers in the Saribas, the Padi, Paku and Rimbas. 
After which, Keppel was called away on orders, but he returned in August 1844 along with EIC steamer Phlegethon. By this time Serib Sahib had abandoned the Sadong and retreated to Patusan.  Keppel and Brooke's native forces once again overwhelm all opposition in Patusan and the Undop but are ambushed by the Sea Dayak on the river Skrang at Karangan Peris, resulting in the death of Datu Patinggi Ali. Shortly after this punitive expedition Brooke heard that Mahkota, the former administrator of Kuching area had taken shelter at the Lingga and managed to capture him and sent him back to Brunei.

Relationship to Brunei

To prevent any further dispute with Brunei, Brooke hoped to reform the administration of the Sultanate and establish a pro-British government through Hashim and his brother Pengiran Badruddin. In October 1844, Brooke with the aid of Captain Sir Edward Belcher in HMS Samarang and the EIC steamer Phlegethon returned the two brothers to Brunei. The vessels anchored at the Sultan's audience chamber, requesting Pengiran Yusof's position as Bendahara to be replaced by Hashim and asking the Sultan to pledge to suppress piracy in his dominions, as well ceding the island of Labuan to the British (although the British government had not asked for this). The status of Brooke as a Rajah and consul for the British at the time also remained controversial in the United Kingdom as he was not recognised by the British government to represent the British subjects. Indirectly, Brooke had become involved in an internal dynastic dispute of Brunei.

In August 1845, Rear-Admiral Thomas Cochrane arrived at Brunei with a squadron of from six to eight ships to release two Lascar seamen who were believed to be hidden there. Badruddin accused Yusof of being involved in the slave trade due to his close relations with a notable pirate leader Sharif Usman in Marudu Bay and the Sultanate of Sulu. Denying the allegation, Yusof refused to attend a meeting with Cochrane, and escaped after being threatened with force by Cochrane before regaining his own force in the Brunei capital. Cochrane then sailed away to Marudu Bay in pursuit of Usman, while Yusof was defeated by Badruddin. Hashim managed to establish a rightful position in Brunei Town to become the next Sultan after successfully defeating the piratical forces led by Yusof who fled to Kimanis in northern Borneo where he was executed. Yusof was the favourite noble to the Sultan and with Hashim's victory, this upset the chances of the son of Sultan Omar Ali Saifuddin II to become the next leader. Mahkota, after his capture in Sarawak in 1844 became the Sultan's adviser in the absence of Yusof who had been executed. He prevailed on the Sultan to order the execution of Hashim, whose presence had become unwelcome to the royal family, especially due to his close ties with Brooke that were favourable to English policy. Beside that, an adventurer named Haji Saman, who was connected to the late Yusof, played upon the Sultan's fear of Hashim taking over his throne.

By the order of the Sultan, Hashim and his brother Badruddin together with their family were assassinated in 1846. One of Badruddin's slaves, Japar, survived the attack and intercepted HMS Hazard, which brought him to Sarawak to inform Brooke. Enraged by the news, Brooke organised an expedition to avenge Hashim's death with the aid of Cochrane from the Royal Navy with Phlegethon. On 6 July 1846, Sultan Omar Ali Saifuddin II complained through a letter about the discourtesy of HMS Hazard and invited Cochrane to ascend the capital with two boats. HEICS Phlegethon, HMS Spiteful and HMS Royalist then moved up to the river on 8 July where they were fired on from every position with slight damage. Mahkota and the Sultan retreated  upriver while most of the population fled upon their arrival at Brunei's capital, leaving the brother of the Sultan's son, Pengiran Muhammad, who was badly wounded and Pengiran Mumin, an opponent of the Sultan's son who despised the decision of his royal family to be involved in conflict with the British. The British destroyed the town forts and invited the population to return with no harm to be done to them while the Sultan remained hiding in the jungle. Another expedition was sent to the interior but also failed to find the Sultan. Brooke remained in Brunei with Captain Rodney Mundy and HMS Iris along with Phlegethon and HMS Hazard while the main expedition continued their mission to suppress piracy in northern Borneo.

Upon finding that Haji Saman was living in Membakut and that he was involved in the plotting that caused Hashim's death, the HEICS Phlegethon and HMS Iris departed there destroyed Haji Saman's house and captured the town of Membakut although Saman still managed to escape. Brooke returned again to Brunei and finally managed to induce the Sultan to return to the capital where the Sultan finally regretted the killings of Hashim, his brother and their family members by writing a letter of apology to Queen Victoria. Through his confession, the Sultan recognised Brooke's authority over Sarawak and mining rights throughout the territory without requiring him  to pay any tribute as well granting the island of Labuan to the British. Brooke departed Brunei and left Mumin in charge together with Mundy to keep the Sultan in line until the British government made a final decision to acquire the island. Following the ratification agreement of the transfer of Labuan to the British, the Sultan also finally agreed to allow British forces to suppress all piracy along the coast of Borneo.

Later years 

Brooke in the following year in 1847, acting as HM Commissioner and British Consul to the Sultan and Independent Chiefs of Borneo negotiated the 1847 Treaty of Friendship and Commerce. American policy at the time however made no intention to establish any solid presence in Asia and the Pacific. By 1850, the United States recognised the status of Brooke's raj as an independent state. Sultan Omar Ali Saifuddin II died in 1852 and he was succeeded by Mumin, which already proved a success in Brooke's efforts to establish a pro-British government in Brunei. The new Sultan then ceded the Saribas and Skrang districts, which later became the Second Division, to Brooke in 1853 due to conflict with pirates.

Three major rebellions led by Rentap (1853), Liu Shan Bang (1857) and Syarif Masahor (1860) shook the Rajah's administration which, together with the stagnant economic conditions at the time, caused Brooke to be plagued by debt. He was driven into planning to cede Sarawak to the British to settle his debt; while the idea was supported by some of Britain's members of parliament (MPs) and businessmen, it was rejected by Prime Minister Lord Derby who feared that the introduction of a British taxation system would shock the population more than exercising their own system under the Rajahs. There were also concerns about its financial viability and probable drain on the Exchequer. Brooke then thought to sell his kingdom to Belgium, France, Russia or to Brunei again, or to other European powers rather than to the neighbouring Dutch who were ready to retake Sarawak. Brooke's intention had already been decried by neighbouring British governors such as Labuan Governor Hennessy who, while respecting the Rajah, considered Sarawak a mere vassal state of Brunei.

Prior to the ongoing piracy suppression, a major battle with the Illanuns of Moro pirates from the southern Philippines occurred in mid-November 1862. In 1864, the United Kingdom appointed a Consul to Sarawak and recognised the Raj,. British warships saluted the Raj's flag with 21 guns while entering Kuching as a sign of recognition. However, Netherlands refused recognition. Brooke then expanded his Raj into territory of Brunei. In 1861, he acquired the vast Rajang River basin, which subsequently became the Third Division. The expansion continued after his death in 1868, when he was succeeded by his nephew, Charles Brooke.

Under Charles' administration, Sarawak's economy grew rapidly, especially later on with the discovery of oil, introduction of rubber, and the construction of public infrastructure as his main priorities to stabilise the economic situation and reduce government debts. He encouraged the migration of Chinese to boost the economy, especially in agricultural sectors, where most of them settled around Kuching (mainly Hokkien and Teochew), Sibu (mainly Fuzhou) and Sri Aman (mainly Teochew). Charles was trusted and respected for his fairness and strict order, although he was not so popular among the local Malays as his uncle, while being a close friend to the Dayak. Sarawak prospered under his rule and he did not seek protection from any other European powers although requests for protection from the British in 1869 and 1879 were rejected. Charles continued to seek protection from the British, securing Protected State status from them on 14 June 1888. He ruled Sarawak until his death in 1917 and was succeeded by his son, Charles Vyner Brooke.

World War II and decline 

Following World War I, the Empire of Japan began to expand their range in Asia and the Pacific. Vyner became aware of the growing threats and began to institute reforms. Under the treaty of protection, Britain was responsible for Sarawak's defence but it could do little, most of its forces having been deployed to the war in Europe against Nazi Germany and the Kingdom of Italy. The defence of Sarawak depended on a single Indian infantry regiment, the 2/15 Punjab Regiment, together with the local forces of Sarawak and Brunei. As Sarawak had a significant number of oil refineries in Miri and Lutong, the British feared that these supplies would fall to Japanese control, and thus instructed the infantry to carry out a scorched earth policy.

On 16 December 1941, a Japanese navy detachment on  arrived at Miri from Cam Ranh Bay in French Indochina. The Japanese then launched an air attack on Kuching on 19 December, bombing parts of the town airfield while machine-gunning people in the streets. The attack created panic and sent residents fleeing to rural areas. The Dutch submarine  managed to bring down the Japanese from Miri but, with the arrival of the  together with other ships, the Japanese secured the town on 24 December. From 7 January 1942, Japanese troops in Sarawak crossed the border of Dutch Borneo and proceeded to neighbouring North Borneo. The 2/15 Punjab Regiment were forced to withdraw to Dutch Borneo and later surrendered on 9 March after most of the Allies had surrendered in Java. Most of its surviving crew were massacred on Bangka Island.

Lacking air protection, Sarawak, together with rest of the island, fell to the Japanese and Vyner took sanctuary in Australia. Many of the British and Australian soldiers captured after the fall of Malaya and Singapore were brought to Borneo and held as prisoners of war (POWs) in Batu Lintang camp in Sarawak and Sandakan camp in neighbouring North Borneo. The Japanese military authorities placed the southern part of Borneo under the navy, while its army were responsible for management of the north. As part of the Allied Campaign to retake their possessions in the East, Allied forces were then sent to Borneo in the Borneo Campaign and liberated the island. The Australian Imperial Force (AIF) played a significant role in the mission. The Allies' Z Special Unit provided intelligence gathering which facilitated the AIF landings. Most of the major towns of Sarawak were bombed during this period. The war ended on 15 August 1945 following the Japanese surrender and the administration of Sarawak was undertaken by the British Military Administration (BMA) from September. Vyner returned to administer Sarawak but decided to cede it to the British government as a Crown Colony on 1 July 1946 due to lack of resources to finance reconstruction.

Government 

Prior to the establishment of the Sarawak Administrative Service under the second Rajah, there had been no formal civil administration. The civil service recruited Europeans, mainly British officers, to run district outstations where the residents became exposed to and trained in many British and European methods and culture, while retaining the customs of the indigenous people. After the acquisition of more territory, Sarawak was divided into five divisions, each headed by a Resident. A Resident's job is to establish law and order, convene courts to settle disputes, punish crimes, be accessible at all times to the natives, and "gain the confidence of the chiefs of the wilder tribes and to lead them to accept the Sarawak flag and the benefits of the Rajah's government". The Rajahs also encouraged the establishment of schools, healthcare services and transport.

The government worked to restore peace where piracy and tribal feuds had grown rampant and its success depended ultimately on the co-operation of the native village headmen, while the Native Officers acted as a bridge. The Sarawak Rangers was established in 1862 as a para-military force of the raj. It was superseded by the Sarawak Constabulary in 1932 as a police force, with 900 members mainly comprising Dayaks and Malays.

As a British protected state, all foreign relations were conducted under the purview of the British government although internally remaining an independent state ruled by the Rajahs. According to an agreement signed on 14 June 1888, it was stipulated:

I. The State of Sarawak shall continue to be governed and administered by the said Rajah and his successors as an independent State under the protection of Great Britain; but such protection shall confer no right on Her Majesty's Government to interfere with the internal administration of the State further than is herein provided.
II. In case any question should hereafter arise respecting the rights of succession to the present or any future Ruler of Sarawak, such question shall be referred to Her Majesty's Government for decision.
III. The relations between the State of Sarawak and all foreign States, including the States of Brunei and North Borneo, shall be conducted by Her Majesty's Government, or in accordance with its directions; and if any difference should arise between the Government of Sarawak and that of any other State, the Government of Sarawak agrees to abide by the decision of Her Majesty's Government, and to take all steps necessary to give effect thereto.
IV. Her Majesty's Government shall have the right to establish British Consular officers in any part of the State of Sarawak, who shall receive exequaturs in the name of the Government of Sarawak. They shall enjoy whatever privileges are usually granted to the Consular officers, and shall be entitled to hoist the British flag over their residences and public offices.
V. British subjects, commerce, and shipping shall enjoy the same right, privileges, and advantages as the subjects, commerce, and shipping of the most favoured nation, as well as any other rights, privileges, and advantages which may be enjoyed by the subjects, commerce and shipping of the State of Sarawak.
VI. No cession or other alienation of any part of the territory of the State of Sarawak shall be made by the Rajah or his successors to any foreign State, or the subjects or the citizens thereof, without the consent of Her Majesty's Government; but this restriction shall not apply to ordinary grants or leases of lands or houses to private individuals for purposes of residence, agriculture, commerce, or other business.

Economy

Population
Upon acquisition of his first territories in the First Division, Brooke came into possession of a large quantity of antimony from mines around the area. At the time of his arrival, a land tenure system known as the Native Customary Rights (NCR) had been practised by the indigenous communities. Brooke's first priority was to abolish headhunting among the indigenous communities of the interior.  The kingdom's authorities conducted repeated raids on Sea Dayak villages and, facing a major rebellion, ultimately forced them to practice horticulture and abandon headhunting. Land Dayaks had also been involved in headhunting but more readily abandoned the practice and became loyal followers of Brooke. Most Malay coastal villages were also raided as part of the kingdom's policy to combat piracy and slavery. Despite success in these endeavours, stagnant economic conditions persisted and the kingdom amassed huge debts.

Brooke promoted Chinese immigration, convinced that they would inject vigour into the economy and prove an encouragement to indigenous communities to participate. Initially, most of the immigrants were miners originating from Sambas in neighbouring Dutch Borneo. These later formed a Kongsi system in Bau. The second Rajah continued this policy, particularly targeting the agricultural sector. Conflicts ensued between the government and the Chinese in 1857, believed to have arisen, inter alia, in relation to the Second Opium War.

There was no forced labour, except for prisoners during public works and roads repair. In contrast to Dutch East Indies's forced cultivation system (cultuurstelsel), the indigenous people of Sarawak paid only a small amount of door tax and land rent.

Companies
Borneo Company Limited was formed in 1856. It was involved in a wide range of businesses in Sarawak, including trade, banking, agriculture, mineral exploration and development. The second Rajah worked to stabilise the economy and reduce government debt.  The economy grew significantly under his reign, with total exports reaching $386,439 and imports $414,756 in 1863.

Land
The Rajah established the land tenure policy in 1863 with some minor modifications throughout Brooke's rule. Every inhabitant in Sarawak was entitled to three acres of land, in which sale was prohibited, and no one would own more than 100 acres without the permission of the government. Although the majority of the lands were in smallholders, the Brooke government granted several land concessions to Borneo Company Limited to develop rubber, timber, oil, coal, and antimony.

Agriculture
In 1869, by which time total trade had reached $3,262,500, the second Rajah invited Chinese black pepper and gambier growers from Singapore to cultivate their crops in Sarawak. As a result, by the early 20th century, Sarawak became one of the world's major producers of pepper. The kingdom was a relative latecomer to the natural rubber boom due to the reluctance of the second Rajah to give over indigenous farmland to European companies. In 1910, Rajah declined offers by five foreign companies to set up large-scale rubber plantations here because speculation of rubber prices was "a mania at the present which did not suit the quiet non-speculative spirit of the country". Only five large rubber estates were established during his reign. Oil reserves were discovered in his final years. From the 1930s, through the work of the Chinese businesses in the kingdom, it became a significant raw material supplier, with Singapore as a major trading partner.

Currency 

A Sarawak dollar was first issued in 1858 and remained at par with the Straits dollar. Different notes were issued by the Sarawak Government Treasury, the earliest notes using English, Jawi and Chinese characters. From the 1880s, the notes' background featured the Rajah's portrait and coat of arms.

Society

Demography 

In 1841, Sarawak had an indigenous population of about 8,000. The Dayaks were the largest indigenous group in the interior: comprising Iban, Bidayuh and other interior tribes such as the Kayan, Kelabit, Kenyah, Lun Bawang and Penan, while coastal areas were dominated by the Sarawak local Malays, Melanau, Bruneian and Kedayan. The government of Sarawak welcomed the migration of Chinese workers to boost the economy. Following various immigration schemes initiated by the Rajahs, the population increased to 150,000 in 1848, 300,000 in 1893, 475,000 in 1933, and 600,000 in 1945.

Water transport 
It was during the reign of the Second Rajah that public infrastructure began to be given attention. The river systems in Sarawak are not inter-connected. As a result, coastal ships were used by the Brooke government to carry merchandise from one river system to another. The Brooke government also established a trade route from Kuching to Singapore, using its own ships such as The Royalist, Julia, and The Swift. Among the early cargoes were antimony and gold. The Borneo Company Limited bought another steamer, which they named the Sir James Brooke, to carry antimony, coal, and sago. The ships were the link between Sarawak and Singapore. Charles Brooke encouraged the Sarawak Chamber of Commerce to set up its own shipping lane to Singapore, offering to sell The Royalist to it. In 1875, the "Singapore and Sarawak Steamship Company" was formed and, shortly thereafter, bought The Royalist and the steamer The Rajah Brooke. There were complaints that the company provided irregular services to its customers and, in 1908, the Brooke government transferred another two small steamships, the Adeh and Kaka, to the company in expectation of improvement. In 1919, Chinese interests bought the company's shares, liquidated it and formed a new company named the "Sarawak Steamship Company". The company established shipping lanes linking the Rajang, Limbang, and Baram river systems. The Sibu-Singapore shipping lane was started by the company but soon abandoned, being unprofitable. The establishment of the shipping lanes by Sarawak Steamship Company allowed the indigenous people to participate in wider markets, thus narrowing the income gap between urban and rural areas in Sarawak. The company suffered heavy losses in the trade depression of the 1920s and was acquired by the Singapore-based "Straits Steamship Company". The company established branches at Sibu and Bintulu and installed agents at other small river ports.

Land transport

Land transport in Sarawak was poorly developed owing to the swampy environment around rivers downstream, while dense jungles presented significant challenges to road construction inland. Most of the roads were constructed in coastal areas. Borneo Company Limited and Sarawak Oilfields also constructed a small number of short roads to serve their own economic interests. Meanwhile, in the interior, raised batang paths were made by the natives using logs to connect villages and their environs, easing access to farms and collection of forest produce. At the same time, rivers remained the most important means of transportation to coastal towns. In the first 70 years of Brooke rule, bridle paths were constructed to connect administrative posts to the surrounding districts. After the 1930s, the policy was changed to providing access from villages to navigable rivers. Road construction during the Brooke era was, however, uncoordinated. Most of the roads located near the towns were short, with the exception of the economically important Miri-Lutong road built by Sarawak Oilfields, the Jambusan road to Tegora via the Dahan estate, and Penrissen road built by the Brooke government. Together with the road developments, bullock carts were introduced together with porters, and hand carts in the mid-19th century, followed by rickshaws at the end of the 19th century, and bicycles in the early 20th century. Public motor services appeared in 1912 together with private taxis. In 1915, a short railway connecting Kuching to Tenth Mile was opened to the public. Subsequent construction of a road running parallel to the railway led to substantial losses, however, and its operations were limited to transportation of rocks from Seventh Mile to Kuching.

Electricity and communication

In 1894, while plans for electric street lightning were being drawn up in Penang and Kuala Lumpur on the Malay Peninsula, Rajah Charles Brooke refused to adopt this new technology because of his dislike of "new-fangled things". The sparse population of Sarawak also presented a logistical challenge to install power stations and connecting cables. However, wired telephones were installed around Kuching in 1898 for keeping up to date communications with the outstations. Otherwise, messages from the northernmost areas of the state such as Limbang and Baram could take up to a month to reach Kuching. Besides, telephones were cheap to install and required little power. By 1908, the Mukah-Oya region was connected to telephone lines, followed by Miri in 1913, and Sibu in 1914. The first wireless telegraphy station was erected in Kuching in 1917, followed by Sibu and Miri immediately thereafter. It was not until 1914 that the first electrical power stations were installed in Miri by Anglo-Saxon Petroleum Company and Bau by the Borneo Company Limited. The oil production boom in Miri and gold mining in Bau gave rise to the need of more efficient lightning and motor systems. Cinematography also began the same year in Miri. In 1920, J.R Barnes, the manager of the Sarawak Government Wireless Telegraphs and Telephones Department, proposed an electrical lightning scheme for Kuching using a coal-fired system. Today the road where the power station was once located is now known as the "Power Street". Sibu's first power station was installed in 1927, followed by Mukah in 1929. From 1922 to 1932, the electrical supply in Kuching was managed by the Electrical Department, under the jurisdiction of Public Works Department. This department was then privatised as the Sarawak Electricity Supply Company (SESCo). From the 1930s, a telegraph line connected the country with Singapore. Wireless telegraph stations were located in all major towns in Sarawak. Postal service was also available throughout the administration.

Health

In 1915, Dr Ledingham Christie, surgeon to the Borneo Company Limited, conducted a study regarding latent dysentery and parasitism amongst the Malay population staying near the Sarawak River. Those who had latent dysentery or parasites may not show any symptoms, but they may be pale and thin. The Malays at that time usually dumped their sewage into the river, while bathing or drinking from the same spot, in anticipation that water currents would remove the waste. Among the 100 stool samples tested, whipworm (Trichuris trichiura) and roundworm (Ascaris lumbricoides) were most commonly found. Cholera was endemic in Sarawak; however very little is documented about the disease. The earliest cholera outbreak in Sarawak was in 1873 but it was not known how many died in it. In the same year, Captain Giles Helyer, the commander of the boat Heartsease, died of cholera. Meanwhile, the two children of Rajah James Brooke also died on board the ship SS Hydaspes, possibly due to cholera. In 1888, an outbreak occurred amongst a number of Malays in Simanggang District. In 1902, another cholera pandemic occurred with 1,500 deaths, at a time when an expeditionary force was organised by the Brookes to punish the Dayaks living in the rural areas of the Simanggang District. This was because the Dayaks were killing and attacking friendly neighbours. The epidemic caused the break-up of the expeditionary force without achieving any of its military objectives. There were also outbreaks in 1910 and 1911. Nevertheless, no outbreaks were reported from 1911 to 1941.

The first doctor was appointed shortly after James Brooke was proclaimed Rajah. Kuching Hospital services existed in the 1800s but no records are available. The earliest record of the Kuching Hospital (now Sarawak General Hospital) was available in 1910 which shows it admitted 920 patients that year. In 1925, a leprosy settlement was constructed in Kuching. Rajah Charles Brooke Memorial Hospital was also constructed to treat leprosy patients. In 1931, a facility to treat mental illness was constructed beside the Kuching Hospital. In Sibu, the construction of Lau King Howe Hospital (now Lau King Howe Hospital Memorial Museum) was completed in 1936. In 1935, there were six doctors serving the needs of the senior government servants. The State Health Office (known as Medical Headquarters) was located at the Kuching Pavilion building from 1909 to 1947. There was only one assistant dental officer before the Japanese occupation. Charles Vyner Brooke had been attempting to persuade doctors from the Straits Settlements to serve in Sarawak but the response had been cold. The medical service continued under Japanese occupation. There are few records regarding the development of dentistry in the 1900s. Several accounts from elderly people stated that there were traditional healers and roadside tooth-pullers performing palliative treatments at that time. The first government dentist was appointed in July 1925 at Kuching General Hospital. In 1932, the "Sarawak Government Registration of Dentist Ordinance" was introduced. A total of 15 dentists were registered before the Japanese occupation.

Science 
 In 1854, Alfred Russel Wallace arrived in Kuching  as a guest of James Brooke. In 1855, he wrote a paper entitled "On the law which has regulated the introduction of new species", also known as the "Sarawak Law", which anticipated aspects of Darwin's theory of evolution. It is said, albeit without any evidence, that Charles Brooke approved the construction of Sarawak State Museum in 1888, the oldest museum in Borneo, with endorsement from Wallace.  Charles Hose, who served under Brooke as an administrator in the Baram region, was an avid photographer, naturalist, ethnologist, and author. He is credited with the discovery of various mammal and bird species endemic to Borneo: some of his specimens are now housed in London's Natural History Museum. His ethnological collections are in, amongst others, the British Museum.

Media 
The Journal of the Royal Asiatic Society (since 1820), the Sarawak Gazette (since 1870), and the Sarawak Museum Journal (since 1911) hold a significant amount of information on Sarawak before and during the Rajahs administration.

See also 

 History of Sarawak
 List of heads of government of the Raj of Sarawak
 List of British representatives in the Raj of Sarawak

References

Citations

Sources

Further reading

External links 

 The Brooke Trust – More information on heritage of the Brooke dynasty
 e-Sarawak Gazette - Archive of the Sarawak Gazette ranging from 1907 to 1993
 Trove - Archive of the British Foreign Office Correspondence regarding Borneo (Brunei, Sarawak, Labuan, British North Borneo) 1842-1905
 Trove - Records of the United Society for the Propagation of the Gospel - Borneo and Malaya 1778-1952

 
British Borneo
Sarawak, Kingdom of
Sarawak, Kingdom of
Sarawak, Kingdom of
Sarawak, Kingdom of
States and territories established in 1841
States and territories disestablished in 1946
1841 establishments in Asia
1946 disestablishments in Asia